Saturday Night is a 2022 Indian Malayalam-language comedy-drama film directed by Rosshan Andrrews and written by Naveen Bhaskar. It stars Nivin Pauly, Aju Varghese, Siju Wilson, and Saiju Kurup. The music was composed by Jakes Bejoy. The plot explores the relationship between four friends.

Plot 
Four close friends reunite to find that the fourth, Stanley, to be completely different and mysterious and they set on a journey that explores the mysterious character and discover the true meaning of friendship.

Cast 

 Nivin Pauly as Stanley 
 Aju Varghese as Poocha Sunil
 Saiju Kurup as Justin
 Siju Wilson as Ajith Thomas
Prathap Pothen as Davis Kalathiparambil
Shari as Nirmala Davis
 Grace Antony as Susan Maria Paul
 Saniya Iyappan as Vaishnavi
 Malavika Sreenath as Nikki Immanuel 
 Vijay Menon as Paul John
 Bipin Perumbilli as Manjunath
 Shaani Shacky as Charles
 Ashwin Mathew as Willy
 Niva James as Rachel
 Ashwini as Sherin Joseph 
 Roman Khan

Production

Development 
The film is produced by Vinayaka Ajith under the banner of Ajith Vinayaka films. Naveen Bhaskar completed its script work. Saturday Night with Kirukkanum Koottukaarum is the film's full title. Nivin Pauly portrays Stanley. As per Nivin Pauly's social media post the film is a comedy entertainer.

Casting 
Roshan Andrews who is the director of the film joined hands with Nivin Pauly as hero named Stanley for the film. While Nivin Pauly in the lead role, Aju Varghese, Saiju Kurup and Siju Wilson plays supporting characters.

Filming 
The shooting was started in March 2022. The director Rosshan Andrrews shared a behind the scene video of film shooting on 27 April 2022 that Roshan directing the film. He wrote along with the video, Shoot started… Saturday Night.. Cinematography was by Aslam K. Purayil, editor was T. Shivanandeeswaran.

Music
The music was composed by Jakes Bejoy.

Release

Theatrical
The film was released on 4 November 2022.

Home media
The digital rights of the film is acquired by Disney+ Hotstar and started streaming from 27 January 2023. The satellite rights of the film is acquired by Asianet.

Reception
The film received overwhelmingly negative reviews from critics and audience. The Times Of India rated the film 3 out of 5 stars and wrote "A tale of tight friends that needed tighter editing". Indian express rated the film 0.5 out of 5 and wrote "This Nivin Pauly starrer is a huge disappointment".

References

External links 
 

2022 films